Constituency WR-07 is a reserved seat for women in the Khyber Pakhtunkhwa Assembly.

2013
Nargis Ali

See also
 Constituency PK-44 (Abbottabad-I)
 Constituency PK-45 (Abbottabad-II)
 Constituency PK-46 (Abbottabad-III)
 Constituency PK-47 (Abbottabad-IV)
 Constituency PK-48 (Abbottabad-V)
 Constituency WR-15

References

Khyber Pakhtunkhwa Assembly constituencies